Brandon Spikes (born September 3, 1987) is a former American football linebacker. He played college football for the University of Florida, was recognized as an All-American twice and was a member of two BCS National Championship teams. He was drafted by the New England Patriots in the second round of the 2010 NFL Draft.

Early years
Spikes was born in Shelby, North Carolina.  He attended Crest High School in Shelby, and was a standout high school football player for the Crest Chargers.  Coming out of high school, he was considered one of the best linebacker prospects in the nation, and was rated the number one prospect in the state of North Carolina by Rivals.com and 33rd overall best player in the country according to Scout.com. He was also selected to play in the U.S. Army All-American Bowl.

College career
Spikes accepted an athletic scholarship to attend the University of Florida over offers from several other colleges.  At Florida, he was a four-year letterman, and played for coach Urban Meyer's Florida Gators football team from 2006 to 2009.  Spikes appeared in 47 games for Florida with 39 starts at linebacker.  He registered 307 tackles (178 solo) in his career, with 31.5 for loss, including 6.5 sacks.  He forced two fumbles, recovered four fumbles and had six interceptions which he returned for 139 yards and four touchdowns, more than any other player in the nation and a Florida school record.

Spikes saw limited action in 2006, playing in nine games and recording 15 tackles as the backup to Brandon Siler.  He was a member of the Gators' BCS National Championship team which defeated Ohio State.  In 2007 Spikes became a starter after Siler was selected in the 2007 NFL Draft. He started all 13 games at middle linebacker recording 131 tackles (81 solo), which was second in the Southeastern Conference. He tied for third in the SEC with 3 fumble recoveries.  He also earned first-team All-SEC along with teammate Tim Tebow.

As a junior team captain in 2008, Spikes was a first-team All-SEC selection and a unanimous first-team All-American.  He was selected as a finalist for the Bronko Nagurski Trophy and a semifinalist for the Lombardi Award and Chuck Bednarik Award.  He was a starter at middle linebacker and led the team with 93 tackles on the season, including 8.0 for a loss.  He returned two interceptions for a touchdown tying the school record. He made six tackles in the 2009 BCS National Championship Game win over Oklahoma and had seven tackles, two quarterback hurries and broke up one pass in the 2008 SEC Championship Game against Alabama.  After his junior season, he decided to forgo early entry into the 2009 NFL Draft and returned to Florida for another season.

In 2009, Spikes' production fell to 68 tackles (36 solo).  In an October 31, 2009 game, Spikes was involved in an incident where he attempted to gouge the eyes of Georgia's Washaun Ealey.  As a result of this, Florida coach Urban Meyer suspended Spikes for the first half of their next game against Vanderbilt.  Spikes later announced that he would sit out for the entire game.  As a senior team captain, he was one of three finalists for the 2009 Chuck Bednarik Award, a finalist for the 2009 Butkus Award, a first-team All-SEC selection, and a consensus All-American, receiving first-team honors from The Sporting News and the Walter Camp Football Foundation and second-team honors from the Associated Press.

Professional career

New England Patriots
Spikes was drafted by the New England Patriots in the second round (62nd overall) of the 2010 NFL Draft. He signed a four-year contract on July 26, 2010.  Spikes quickly became a starter at inside linebacker in the Patriots 3–4 defense, alongside Jerod Mayo.  Against Baltimore in Week 6 of his rookie season, Spikes recorded 16 tackles in an overtime Patriots win.  Spikes recorded his first career interception in a Week 13 win over the New York Jets on Monday Night Football.

On December 10, 2010, prior to the Patriots' Week 14 game against the Chicago Bears, Spikes was suspended four games (the remainder of the 2010 regular season) for a violation of the NFL's banned substances policy, reportedly for an ingredient in Spikes' ADHD medication. The same day, Spikes released the following statement:

He finished his rookie season with 61 tackles, one interception, and three passes defensed.  With his season shortened by the suspension, he played in 12 games, starting eight.

At the end of the 2011 season, Spikes and the Patriots appeared in Super Bowl XLVI. He started in the game, but the Patriots lost to the New York Giants by a score of 21–17.

On November 16, 2012, Spikes was fined $25,000 for a late hit against the Buffalo Bills in Week 10.

Spikes dealt with a knee injury during the 2013 season, but played in all 16 games. After being late to practice in January 2014, Spikes was placed on injured reserve. Spikes was not re-signed by the team in the offseason.

Buffalo Bills
On March 14, 2014, Spikes agreed to a one-year, $3.25 million contract with the Buffalo Bills. On September 12, 2014, Spikes was fined $8,268 for a late hit on Chicago Bears wide receiver Santonio Holmes.

New England Patriots (second stint)
On May 18, 2015, Spikes agreed to a one-year contract to return to the Patriots. On June 8, 2015, Spikes was released due to a police investigation dealing with an abandoned car belonging to Spikes, which was possibly involved in a hit-and-run. Massachusetts State Police cited Spikes on June 12, 2015 for leaving a scene of an accident with injury, driving negligently, and failing to stay within marked lanes.

Buffalo Bills (second stint)
Spikes signed a one-year contract with the Buffalo Bills on August 7, 2016.

NFL statistics

Personal life

As a child, Spikes was raised by his brother, Breyon Middlebrooks, while their mother, Sherry Allen, worked 12-hour days at a fiberglass plant. In 2003, Middlebrooks was found guilty of first-degree murder and sentenced to life in prison, the result of a drug deal in 2001. He writes to Spikes regularly and watches what games he can from his cell at Scotland Correctional Institute in Laurinburg, North Carolina. He is the younger cousin of former NFL linebacker Takeo Spikes.

He is married to Lela Woods, with whom he shares a daughter, and both of them appeared on Oxygen's special on his Florida teammate Aaron Hernandez.

See also

 2006 Florida Gators football team
 2008 Florida Gators football team
 2008 College Football All-America Team
 2009 College Football All-America Team
 List of Florida Gators football All-Americans
 List of Florida Gators in the NFL Draft
 List of New England Patriots players

References

Bibliography
 Carlson, Norm, University of Florida Football Vault: The History of the Florida Gators, Whitman Publishing, LLC, Atlanta, Georgia (2007).  .

External links
  Florida Gators bio
  New England Patriots bio
 Buffalo Bills bio

1987 births
Living people
People from Shelby, North Carolina
Players of American football from North Carolina
American football linebackers
Florida Gators football players
All-American college football players
New England Patriots players
Buffalo Bills players
American sportspeople in doping cases
Doping cases in American football